Ellis Horowitz is an American computer scientist and Professor of Computer Science and Electrical Engineering at the University of Southern California (USC). Horowitz is best known for his computer science textbooks on data structures and algorithms, co-authored with Sartaj Sahni. At USC, Horowitz was chairman of the Computer Science Department from 1990 to 1999. During his tenure he significantly improved relations between Computer Science and the Information Sciences Institute (ISI), hiring senior faculty, and establishing the department's first industrial advisory board. From 1983 to 1993 with Lawrence Flon he co-founded Quality Software Products which designed and built UNIX application software. Their products included two spreadsheet programs, Q-calc and eXclaim, a project management system, MasterPlan, and a floating license server, Maitre D. The company was sold to Island Graphics.

Education
 B.S. (Mathematics) Brooklyn College, 1964.
 M.S. (Computer Science) University of Wisconsin–Madison, 1967.
 Ph.D. (Computer Science) University of Wisconsin–Madison, 1969.

Peer-to-peer systems
Horowitz has been actively engaged as an expert witness testifying in numerous peer-to-peer file sharing legal cases. Generally, he has represented the copyright owner, including individual record companies, the Recording Industry Association of America, and the Motion Picture Association of America. 
His testimony has been cited numerous times in various decisions and orders, in particular:

 Horowitz was cited in the Arista Records LLC v. Lime Group LLC case.
 His testimony was also cited in RIAA versus MP3tunes.
 In several BitTorrent cases including MPAA versus isoHunt.

More recently, Horowitz has represented Universal Music Group (UMG) and others against the music streaming service Grooveshark.com. Summary judgment was awarded to UMG, with the decision citing Horowitz' expert reports.

Distance education
In 1999, Horowitz was appointed Director of Information Technology and Distance Education in USC's Viterbi School of Engineering. Part of his responsibilities included their satellite-based closed circuit instructional network. He renamed the organization USC's Distance Education Network (DEN) and moved course delivery from satellite to the Web. DEN currently offers numerous graduate level courses leading to master's degrees, primarily in computer science and electrical engineering. In 2000 he received an outstanding distance education educator award from R1edu.org.

Selected publications
Ellis Horowitz has published numerous technical articles and several books, including:

 1975. 
 1984. 
 2007.

References

External links
 

1944 births
Living people
People from New York City
Brooklyn College alumni
University of Wisconsin–Madison College of Letters and Science alumni
American computer scientists
Computer science writers
University of Southern California faculty
American textbook writers